The 18th International 500-Mile Sweepstakes Race was held at the Indianapolis Motor Speedway on Friday, May 30, 1930. The race was part of the 1930 AAA Championship Car season.

Pole position winner Billy Arnold took the lead on lap 3, and led the entire rest of the race. He led a total of 198 laps (all consecutive), which stands as an all-time Indianapolis 500 race record. Arnold was accompanied by riding mechanic Spider Matlock.

Arnold was the first driver to complete the entire 500 miles in under five hours (over 100 mph average speed) without relief help. Pete DePaolo finished the 1925 race in under five hours, but used a relief driver for 21 laps. Arnold would eventually be named the first member of the prestigious 100 mph Club.

The race was marred by the death of Paul Marshall. He was acting as riding mechanic for his brother Cy when their car hit and flipped over the wall. His brother survived with serious injuries.

Rules changes and the "Junk" formula
The 1930 race ushered in a series of substantially new engine rules and specifications. The allotted displacement was increased from 91 cu. in. (1.5 L) to 366 cu. in. (6.0 L). Superchargers were banned with the exception of two-cycle engines, and riding mechanics were made mandatory once again. In addition, the traditional mandate of a maximum 33-car field was lifted. This rules package would be in place through 1937.

Contrary to popular belief, the rule changes were not made in response to the stock market crash of 1929. The rules package is sometimes referred to disparagingly as the "Junk Formula" or the "Junkyard," and a common misconception is that it was implemented in order to dumb down the cars and maintain full fields during the Great Depression.

Speedway president Eddie Rickenbacker had decided to make the changes in order to lure back the passenger car manufacturers, and make the cars on the track more resemble those sold to the motoring public. Rickenbacker's desire was to move away from the supercharged, specialized racing machines that had taken over the Speedway through the 1920s. It was his vision at the time to bring the Speedway back to its origins and roots as a "proving ground" for the passenger car industry. Upon announcing the rule changes, he was quoted as saying, "Even a Model T can win."  The rule changes were in fact being laid out as early as 1928, and were approved by the AAA Contest Board in early January 1929.

Race schedule

Practice
The deadline for entries to be submitted was midnight on May 1. The track was made available for practice a couple days later, with the first car taking to the track on or around Tuesday May 6. Most cars did not arrive at the Speedway until the second full week, with activity picking up mid-month.

By Monday May 19, a total of ten cars had taken to the track, with Louis Schneider (105 mph) posting the fastest lap thus far. On Tuesday May 20, the focus of attention was on the 201-c.i.d, 16-cylinder, Sampson Special of Louis Meyer. The car was now completed and wheeled out of its garage at the Steinhart Brake Services building. It was cranked up for the first time, and ready to deliver to the Speedway. Back at the track, Shorty Cantlon turned a lap of 109 mph.

On Wednesday May 21, Louis Meyer took to the track for the first time, blistering the bricks with a lap of 110.56 mph in the 16-cylinder machine. Meyer immediately established himself as a favorite for the front row. Meanwhile, Harry Hartz, who had not yet taken any laps in his front wheel drive Miller Special, was still expected to qualify come Saturday.

On Thursday May 22, Ralph Hepburn (112.20 mph) and Billy Arnold (111.83 mph) took laps in Harry Hartz's Miller Special. They were the two fastest laps thus far for the month. Speculation was growing that Hartz was preparing to hand the car over to either Hepburn or Arnold, but no official arrangement had been announced. As late as Friday night, Hartz was still insisting to the press that he was intending to race the car himself.

Time trials
Qualifications was scheduled for five days, spanning from Saturday May 24 through Wednesday May 28. Four-lap qualifying runs were utilized, and cars were allowed up to three attempts. The minimum speed required was 85 mph. Time trials would end each day at sundown.

Saturday May 24
The first day of time trials was held Saturday May 24, scheduled for 11 a.m. to 7:01 p.m. L. L. Corum was the first car to qualify. Car owner Harry Hartz took the #4 Miller Special out for a shake-down qualifying attempt. After one official lap of 110.429 mph, he parked the car and handed it over to Billy Arnold. Arnold proceeded to win the pole position with a four-lap run of 113.268 mph.

One day after smacking the wall, Ernie Triplett qualified sixth. After practicing on Friday at over 111 mph, and being a favorite for the pole position, Louis Meyer fell short of expectations. Meyer qualified second, owing to an ill-conceived gear ratio change the team decided to make on Saturday morning.

No major incidents were reported.

Source: The Indianapolis News

Sunday May 25
Only two cars completed qualifying runs on Sunday May 25. Peter DePaolo was forced to change engines after crankshaft damage suffered on Saturday. Tony Gulotta put in the 12th-fastest speed thus far in the field, but as a second day qualifier, lined up in 20th starting position.

Rookie owner/driver Julius C. Slade quit his run after only two laps, then eventually would hand the car over to Roland Free. Rick Decker also pulled in after only two laps.

Source: The Indianapolis News

Monday May 26
Three cars completed qualifying runs on Monday May 26, filling the field to 24 cars. Bill Cummings led the speed chart for the day, with a run of 106.173 mph, the fourth-fastest car in the field. Cummings car arrived late in the day, and he completed his run after 6 p.m., shortly before the track closed for the day. Cummings day was not without incident, as he nearly involved in an accident along with Peter DePaolo as they drove the car to the Speedway grounds.

Four other drivers took to the track, but failed to complete their runs. Bill Denver quit after two laps. Rick Decker, making his second attempt, blew an engine after completing only one lap. Likewise, Julius C. Slade, also making his second attempt in two days, threw a rod on his final lap. Babe Stapp took to the track just before sundown, but pulled off the track apparently before starting the attempt.

Source: The Indianapolis News

Tuesday May 27
Six cars made qualifying attempts on Tuesday May 27, with all six running to completion. Wilbur Shaw led the speed chart for the day, with a four-lap average of 106.132 mph. There were no major incidents reported.

A day after practicing over 100 mph, Joe Huff did not disappoint, putting in the second-fastest speed of the afternoon. Rick Decker, who threw a rod and blew the engine in his #31 Decker Special on Monday, spent the day working a new engine. Decker made a deal with Fred Clemmons, owner of the #48 Hoosier Pete entry. Clemmons was unable to secure a chassis for his 4-cylinder Hoosier Pete engine, so he allowed Decker to install it in his car. The team expected to be out on the track for Wednesday.

Juan Gaudino (#52) and Fred Fansin (#53) officially scratched their entries, after they failed to arrive. At the end of the day, the field was filled to 30 cars. About twelve hopefuls remained, looking to qualify on Wednesday.

Source: The Indianapolis News

Wednesday May 28
The final day of qualifications was held on Wednesday May 28, with time trials officially ending at sundown (7:04 p.m.) A total of eight cars managed to qualify for the race bringing the field to 38 cars. With an entry list featuring as many as 46-47 possible qualifiers, a total of four failed to qualify, and three cars never arrived. No cars were bumped or "crowded out."

Deacon Litz was the fastest qualifier for the day, with a run of 105.755 mph. After two failed attempts, Rick Decker finally made the field, after he finished installation of the Hoosier Pete engine. Fred Roberts and Rollin May failed to complete their attempts. Roberts threw a rod, and May was too slow to meet the 80 mph minimum speed. Doc MacKenzie never made it out to the track, and Sam Greco threw a rod with only thirty minutes left in the day.

Source: The Indianapolis News

Starting grid

Alternates
First alternate: none

Failed to qualify
Rollin May (#51) – Incomplete qualifying attempt (Too slow)
James Klemos/Fred Roberts (#37) – Incomplete qualifying attempt (Engine failure)
Sam Greco (#49) – Incomplete qualifying attempt (Engine failure)
Rick Decker (#31) – Engine failure
Doc MacKenzie (#43) – Did not attempt to qualify
Fred Fansin (#53) – Withdrawn/Car did not arrive
Juan Gaudino (#52) – Withdrawn/Car did not arrive
Duesenberg (#47) – Withdrawn/Car did not arrive

Sources:

Race recap

First half
Louis Meyer in his 16-cylinder Miller grabbed the lead at the start, out-dueling polesitter Billy Arnold on the first lap. Meyer led laps 1 and 2, then Arnold took the lead on lap 3. Arnold would not relinquish the lead the rest of the afternoon.

On the grid, Rick Decker's engine failed to crank, and he did not start the race. When the crew finally got his car running, it lasted only 8 laps. Chet Gardner was out on the first lap after he spun and brushed the wall on the north end, damaging his left front wheel. Gardner became the first driver in Indy history to drop out of the race without completing a single lap.

A huge crash broke out on the leader's 23rd lap. Fred Roberts (driving relief for Pete DePaolo) lost control and crashed in turn three. He collected the car of Deacon Litz, who suffered a broken arm. Litz's riding mechanic Lloyd Barnes suffered a cut to the head. The cars of Johnny Seymour, Babe Stapp, Lou Moore, and Marion Trexler also got caught up in the incident. Stapp's car rode up the wall, but he was not seriously injured. Jimmy Gleason's car suffered damage driving through the debris, and he drove back to the pits. He dropped out with what was discovered to be broken timing gears.

After leading early, Louis Meyer was forced to make a pit stop on lap 22 to repair a broken throttle connection. He lost over four minutes in the pits, and dropped as far down as 13th place. He returned to the track, and started charging back up the standings.

On the leader's 31st lap, Cy Marshall wrecked in turn three. The driver was pinned under the wreckage, but survived. His brother, riding mechanic Paul Marshall, was thrown from the car, and died of a fractured skull.

Second half
Billy Arnold won over second place Shorty Cantlon by a margin of over seven minutes (about 4 laps). Arnold was not challenged by any of the other competitors in the second half. During a pit stop on lap 111, Arnold did not request relief help, and managed to drive the entire 500 miles without relief.

Arnold led a total of 198 laps (laps 3–200) to set an all-time Indianapolis 500 record for most total laps led (198), and most consecutive laps led (198).

Second place Shorty Cantlon was relieved by Herman Schurch for laps 97 through 151.

Louis Meyer worked his way back into the top five by lap 140, but was unable to close the gap on Arnold. Meyer held fourth place over the final 50 laps, and finished sixteen minutes behind.

Box score

Note: Cars not finishing were awarded positions in the order in which they left the track, regardless of lap count

Statistics

Race details
For 1930, riding mechanics were required. It was the first time since 1922 that riding mechanics were mandatory.
This was the first Indy 500 to utilize the green flag to signify the start of the race. Previous years had used the red flag, before the development of standard uniform traffic guidelines and protocol as defined by the MUTCD and AASHTO.
This was the first 500 after the stock market crash of 1929, and the first to be held under the Great Depression.

Chet Miller
One of the most famous nostalgic stories of Indianapolis 500 lore occurred with driver Chet Miller during the 1930 race. Just short of the mid-way point, Miller was in for a pit stop in his Fronty-Ford. The car, which was made up mostly of Model T parts, was discovered to have a broken right front spring. Race officials would not let Miller return to the track until repairs were made, so the crew began a search for suitable replacement parts.

Within a short time, the crew spotted an unattended Model T, that ostensibly belonged to a spectator, parked nearby in the infield. With the owner nowhere in sight, the crew proceeded to remove the spring they needed, and subsequently installed it on Miller's race car sitting in the pit area. After a stop of over 41 minutes, Miller was back out on the track with the borrowed spring, and drove to a 13th-place finish.

Following the race, with the vehicle's owner still not located, the crew went back to the infield and re-installed the spring on the unknown spectator's Model T. It is believed that the owner of the car was never aware of the entire situation.

Notes

Works cited
Indianapolis 500 History: Race & All-Time Stats – Official Site

References

Indianapolis 500 races
Indianapolis 500
Indianapolis 500
1930 in American motorsport
May 1930 sports events